Tunka Tunka is a 2021 Punjabi-language drama film directed by Garry Khatrao, produced by IG Studios, and written by J Davin. It stars Hardeep Grewal and Hashneen Chauhan and was released on 5 August 2021. It is the debut film of Hardeep Grewal.

Plot 
Tunka Tunka's story revolves around a boy (Fateh Singh) who aspires to beat the world in a race with his 24-inch ‘Desi’ cycle. He toils hard under the guidance of a significant mentor. Furthermore, he starts his journey and soon his passion brings him laurels. He grabs the title of a nationwide biking champion. But, as it says no battle comes easy. Fateh encounters a series of hindrances in his journey to success. However, his life takes a halt when he discovers he's been infected with cancer.

Cast 
Hardeep Grewal
Hashneen Chauhan
Sardar Sohi
Balwinder Bullet
Lakha Lehri
Antar
Jagdeep Sarpanch
Armaan
Sameep Ranaut
Rubina Dhaliwal
Mandeep Singh

Reception 
The reviewer for Kidaan.com called the film "a must-watch because it has something usual, and really motivating."

References 

2021 films
2021 drama films
Punjabi-language Indian films
2020s Punjabi-language films